Glenn Head (born May 14, 1958 in Madison, New Jersey) is an American cartoonist and comic book editor living in Brooklyn, New York.  His cartooning has a strong surrealist bent and is heavily influenced by 1960s underground comix.

Much of his work has appeared in comix anthologies, starting with Bad News 1, 2 and 3 (editors Paul Karasik and Mark Newgarden) and R. Crumb’s Weirdo magazine (#25).  Head was a frequent contributor to the Fantagraphics quarterly comix anthology Zero Zero.  His strip “Skateboard Mayhem” was featured in the Simon & Schuster anthology Mind Riot: Coming of Age in Comix.

Glenn Head’s comics and illustrations have appeared in a wide variety of publications, from The Wall Street Journal to Screw.  Magazines and newspapers that have published his work include The New York Times, Playboy, New Republic, Sports Illustrated, Pulse Magazine, Advertising Age, Interview, Entertainment Weekly, and Nickelodeon Magazine.

Head's solo work includes Avenue D, comix about life on the Lower East Side; two issues of Guttersnipe comix, which combine grunge, surrealism, and autobiography; and a self-published sketchbook character study, Head Shots.

From 2005 to 2010 Head edited and contributed to the Harvey- and Eisner Award-nominated anthology HOTWIRE Comics (three issues). From 2009 to 2015 he created his graphic epic, Chicago. This coming-of-age memoir centers around a starry-eyed 19-year-old with dreams of underground comics glory as he encounters his heroes, faces homelessness, despair, insanity, and somehow survives.

A student of Art Spiegelman at the School of Visual Arts in the early ‘80s (in the environment that created RAW), Head learned how to put comic books together.  Head edited and contributed to three issues of Snake Eyes (with co-editor Kaz) and the pulp-crime underground comix anthology Hotwire Comix & Capers (numbers 1, 2 and 3).

Awards 
His work as an editor garnered the following attention:
 1992 Harvey Award nomination for Best Anthology for Snake Eyes #2
 2007 Eisner Award for Best Anthology nomination for Hotwire Comix
 2007 Harvey Award for Best Anthology nomination for Hotwire Comix

Exhibitions 
Head's fine art has been exhibited in New York and across the country:
 1993 "Comic Power" (Exit Art, New York City) traveling show
 1997 "Art and Provocation: Images from Rebels" (Boulder Museum of Contemporary Art)
 2000 "New York Press Illustrators Show" (CB’s 313 Gallery)

Head’s editorial cartooning appeared in the "Inx" show at Hofstra University.

Bibliography 
 “How I Spent My Summer on Avenue B” in Bad News #1, 1983, self-published, ASIN: B00H6YCUSS — Bad News was a 1983–1988 comix anthology put together by Art Spiegelman’s SVA independent study class. 
  “The Bugs” in Bad News #2, 1984, self-published, ASIN: B004EL5XK8
 “Belinda’s Topless Go-Go Lounge” in Bad News #3, 1988, edited by Paul Karasik and Mark Newgarden, Bad News Press/Fantagraphics, ASIN: B004X2X8D2.
 Weirdo #25, 1988, Last Gasp, edited by R. Crumb
 Glenn Head’s Avenue D: Comics & Stories, 1986, self-published, ASIN: B000727IGK
 Avenue D, 1991, Fantagraphics, ASIN: B00396SY4G
 Snake Eyes, 1990, Fantagraphics, ASIN: B009E04P3K, 
 Snake Eyes #2, 1992, Fantagraphics, 
 Snake Eyes #3, 2001, Fantagraphics, 
 Zero Zero #1, 1995, Fantagraphics, ASIN: B002ZD5IGG
 Zero Zero #2, 1995, Fantagraphics, ASIN: B002ZDAYOW
 Zero Zero #3, 1995, Fantagraphics, ASIN: B002ZDBD6A
 Zero Zero #6, 1995, Fantagraphics, ASIN: B002ZDECJU
 Zero Zero #14, 1997, Fantagraphics, ASIN: B00DCHV0OI
 Zero Zero #19, August 1997, Fantagraphics, ASIN: B002ZF17RI
 Zero Zero #20, September/October 1997, Fantagraphics, ASIN: B002ZF8ZX2
 Guttersnipe Comics #1, 1994, Fantagraphics, ASIN: B000PBP9OQ
 Guttersnipe Comix #2, 1996, Fantagraphics, ASIN: B006071WFE
 “Skateboard Mayhem!” in Mind Riot: Coming of Age in Comix, 1997, edited by Karen D. Hirsch , 
 Dirty Stories Vol. 3, 2002, Fantagraphics, edited by Eric Reynolds
 True Porn #2, 2005, edited by Robyn Chapman
 Best Erotic Comics, 2008, Last Gasp, 
 Best Erotic Comics, 2009, Last Gasp, 
 Hotwire Comix and Capers Vol. 1, 2006, Fantagraphics, 
 Hotwire Comics, Vol. 2, 2008, Fantagraphics, 
 Hotwire, Vol. 3, 2010, Fantagraphics, 
 Chicago, A Comix Memoir By Glenn Head, 2015, Fantagraphics, ASIN: B014VDFSL2,

References

1958 births
Living people
American cartoonists
School of Visual Arts alumni
Artists from New Jersey